Ehsaas is a 1972 Pakistani Urdu film directed by Nazar-ul-Islam. The lead cast included Nadeem, Shabnam, Qavi, Lehri, and  Rangeela. The film won 3 Nigar Awards in the best actor, director, and screenwriter categories.

Cast
 Nadeem
 Shabnam
 Qavi
 Lehri
  Rangeela
 Agha Talish
 Ajmal
 Sentosh Russal
 Mumtaz
 Sofia Bano
 Jalil Afghani

Music and soundtracks
The playback music of Ehsaas was composed by Robin Ghosh. The lyrics were penned by Suroor Barabankvi and Akhtar Yousuf:

 Aap Ka Husn Jo Dekha To Khuda Yaad Aya... Singer(s): Mehdi Hassan
 Aap Ka Husn Jo Dekha To Khuda Yaad Aya... Singer(s): Runa Laila
 Allah Allah, Meri Mehfil Mein Woh Mehman Aya... Singer(s): Runa Laila, Ahmad Rushdi
 Bheegi Bheegi, Thandi Hawa, Jhuki Jhuk Urti Ghata, Mousam Hay Deevana... Singer(s): Runa Laila, Masood Rana
 Hamen Kho Kar Buhat Pachhtao Gay... Singer(s): Runa Laila
 Ik Din Kaya Hua, Waqt Tha Subha Ka... Singer(s): Runa Laila
 Ruk Jao, Abhi Mat Jao... Singer(s): Ahmad Rushdi, Shehnaz Begum

Release and box office
Ehsaas was released on 22 December 1972. It was a silver jubilee hit that completed 31 weeks at the main theater.

Awards

References

1972 films
Pakistani romantic musical films
1970s Urdu-language films
Nigar Award winners
1972 romantic drama films
Pakistani romantic drama films
Urdu-language Pakistani films